The 2015–16 season is Rudar's 21st season in the Slovenian PrvaLiga, Slovenian top division, since the league was created.

Players
As of 1 March 2016

Source:NK Rudar Velenje

Competitions

Overall

Overview

PrvaLiga

League table

Results summary

Results by round

Matches

Cup

First round

Round of 16

Quarter-finals

Statistics

Squad statistics

Goalscorers

See also
2015–16 Slovenian PrvaLiga
2015–16 Slovenian Football Cup

References

External links
Official website 
PrvaLiga profile 
Twitter profile
Facebook profile

Slovenian football clubs 2015–16 season